The James Memorial Library in Williston, North Dakota was built in 1911 in Beaux Arts style.

It was listed on the National Register of Historic Places in 1979.

According to its NRHP nomination, the library "is both architecturally and historically important to the Williston community."

The building is now home to the James Memorial Art Center.  The Center includes an art gallery for exhibits of local, regional and international art in all media.  An additional gallery is used for exhibitions, performances, meetings and receptions. There is an auditorium with a theatre, and a classroom for art classes for adults and children.

References

External links
 James Memorial Art Center

Library buildings completed in 1911
Libraries on the National Register of Historic Places in North Dakota
Beaux-Arts architecture in North Dakota
Tourist attractions in Williams County, North Dakota
Arts centers in North Dakota
1911 establishments in North Dakota
National Register of Historic Places in Williams County, North Dakota